is a Japanese actress from Tokyo.  Starting acting in her teens with a role in the Sailor Moon musicals, she has developed into a lead actress in film and television, playing the heroine in the Asadora Tsubasa, starring in TV comedy series such Yasuko to Kenji and Deka Wanko, and playing the lead in films such as Kimi ni Todoke and Piece of Cake.

Career 

Tabe was born in Tokyo and began working in entertainment in 2002 at the age of 13. Her debut as an actress was in the Wowow drama Riyū in 2004. Her acting in the films Hinokio and Aozora no yukue earned her the Blue Ribbon Awards for Best Newcomer in 2006. In 2008, she was selected from the 1593 actresses who auditioned to play the heroine of the NHK Asadora Tsubasa, which ran for 156 episodes from March to September 2009.

Filmography

Feature Films/Movies

Short Films/Movies

Plays and Musicals

Plays

Musicals

Television

Dramas

Shows

Animations and Games

Games

Animations

Awards and Prizes

Awards

Special Awards

References

External links 
 Tabe Mikako Official web site 
 

1989 births
Living people
21st-century Japanese actresses
People from Tokyo
Asadora lead actors
Tokyo Woman's Christian University alumni